Casero is a surname. Notable people with the surname include:

Alfredo Casero (born 1962), Argentine musician, actor and comedian
Ángel Casero (born 1972),  Spanish road bicycle racer
Belén Fernández Casero (born 1974), Spanish politician
Nazareno Casero (born 1986), Argentine film and television actor
Rafael Casero (born 1976), Spanish professional road bicycle racer
Sigfredo Casero-Ortiz (born 1997), Cuban-born naturalized Belgian professional basketball player

See also 
Caseros (disambiguation)